Saeid Rajabi may refer to
Saeid Rajabi (futsal) (born 1965), Iranian futsal player
Saeid Rajabi (taekwondo) (born 1996), Iranian taekwondo competitor